Robert Buettner  is an American author of military science fiction novels.  He is a former military intelligence officer, National Science Foundation Fellow in Paleontology, and has been published in the field of natural resources law. He has written five volumes of the Jason Wander series, three volumes of the Orphan's Legacy series, the stand-alone novel The Golden Gate, numerous short stories and novellas, and the afterword to an anthology of stories by the late Robert Heinlein. Buettner currently lives in Georgia.

Bibliography

Novels

Jason Wander series

War Is an Orphanage: Jason Wander, left orphaned at age 17 by an attack from an unseen alien enemy, must fight his own demons before he can fight Earth's.  Jason starts off on a self-destructive streak that leads to being expelled from school, through foster homes and finally to an appointment with a no-nonsense judge.  As the world begins falling apart, Jason is given the choice of so many others, from an earlier time in American history: join the Army or go to jail.  This decision leads to an odyssey of adventures that takes Jason Wander from the pits of despair to the heights of victory.  In the spirit of Johnnie Rico and Starship Troopers, Robert Buettner crafts a story that is as much about a young man coming of age as it is about fighting alien creatures.

 Orphanage (April 1, 2008 – Reissued), the first volume in the "Jason Wander" series. Mankind's first alien contact tears into Earth: projectiles launched from Jupiter's moon, Ganymede, vaporize whole cities. Under siege, humanity gambles on one desperate counterstrike. In a spacecraft scavenged from scraps and armed with Vietnam-era weapons, foot soldiers like eighteen-year-old Jason Wander-orphans that no one will miss-must dare man's first interplanetary voyage and invade Ganymede.
 Orphan's Destiny (April 1, 2008 – Reissued), the second volume in the "Jason Wander" series. At twenty-five, General Jason Wander has fought and won man's only alien conflict. Now, after long years in space, he's coming home...but to what? Earth's desperate nations, impoverished by war damage and military spending, are slashing defense budgets. There's just one problem with this new worldwide policy-the first alien invasion was merely Plan A. Suddenly, the real assault begins: Earth is attacked by a vast armada of city-sized warships. To block their invasion, mankind has only one surviving craft and a single guerrilla strike force...a suicide squad led by Jason Wander."
 Orphan's Journey (April 1, 2008 – Reissued), the third volume in the "Jason Wander" series. In the years since the last Slug War, Jason's command style has not made him any friends in the Army. Now, in an effort to keep him out of trouble, the Army has sent Jason to the vast, Earth-orbiting resort called New Moon. At the core of this enormous space station is a starship, a relic from the last war. When a test run of the ship goes wrong, Jason, along with a handful of others, will be torn from orbit and thrust into space. Now, stranded on an alien planet, Jason realizes that not only are his friends looking to him for rescue, but an entire planet sees him as their only hope.
 Orphan’s Alliance (October 28, 2008), the fourth volume in the "Jason Wander" series. Humans have been discovered on the Outworlds. And the Army decides to send emissaries. Emissaries like Jason Wander. As intraplanetary conflicts rage around him, and the personal stakes get ever higher, Jason finds that playing planet-hopping politician can be harder than commanding armies. When united mankind squares off to battle the Slugs for a precious interstellar crossroad, Jason will discover that the most dangerous enemy may be the one he least expects.
 Orphan's Triumph (May 26, 2009), the fifth volume in the "Jason Wander" series. Jason Wander is ready to lead the final charge into battle. After forty years of fighting the Slugs, mankind's reunited planets control the vital crossroad that secures their uneasy union. The doomsday weapon that can end the war, and the mighty fleet that will carry it to the Slug homeworld, lie within humanity's grasp. Since the Slug Blitz orphaned Jason Wander, he has risen from infantry recruit to commander of Earth's garrisons on the emerging allied planets. But four decades of service have cost Jason not just his friends and family, but his innocence. When an enemy counter strike threatens to reverse the war and destroy mankind, Jason must finally confront not only his lifelong alien enemy, but the reality of what a lifetime as a soldier has made him.

Orphan's Legacy Series

In March 2011, Baen Books, distributed by Simon & Schuster, released Overkill, Buettner's sixth novel and first in a new series, which will include at least three books.  This series is set a generation after the Jason Wander books and includes characters from the earlier series, both directly and by reference.  A continuing theme is the search by the protagonist, Jazen Parker, for his parents.

 Overkill (March 2011), . Jazen Parker, a Legion soldier recently separated from service, accepts a bodyguard assignment to a rich tourist on the planet known as "Dead End."  Jazen forms both personal and professional connections as a result.
 Undercurrents (July 2011), . Jazen Parker is asked to infiltrate a planet to investigate some disappearances.  Personal reasons drive him to accept the assignment. This novel begins to explore the "cold war" conflict between Earth, which has a monopoly on interstellar spaceflight, and Yavet, a heavily populated planet with draconian population control and an ambition to overtake and surpass Earth. Jazen's personal moral code also conflicts, to a degree, with the goals of the organization, and people, with whom he works.
 Balance Point (April 2014), . While Jazen Parker attempts to determine his future, his past makes him pivotal in a plot that could upset the balance of power between Earth and Yavet.  The volume also includes the short work Mole Hunt.  N.B.: In the Afterword, Buettner indicates that Balance Point is his final "homage to science fiction classics".

The first two novels in this series incorporated antique (by the standards of the time depicted) tanks.  Buettner is the son of a tanker.

Other
The Golden Gate (January 2017)
 A novel centered around factual developments in human longevity, and its impact on interstellar travel, set in the near future.

My Enemy's Enemy (June 2019, trade paperback)
 An alternate history of Nazi Germany's nuclear weapons program, as revealed through the contemporary pursuit of a nuclear terrorist bent on starting World War III.

Short stories
 "Mole Hunt" (June 2011), Published on line by Baen Books as part of the Baen Free Library, https://www.baen.com/readonline/index/read/sku/9781451637786 Set in Buettner's Orphanage-Orphan's Legacy universe, just after his novel, Undercurrents, and offers a glimpse at Yavet efforts on "Dead End" to recover a critical piece of Earth technology.
 "Sticks and Stones" in Armored (March, 2012), edited by John Joseph Adams. set in Buettner's Orphanage-Orphan's Legacy Universe.
 "Magic and Other Honest Lies" (April, 2014), Published on line by Baen Books as part of the Baen Free Library https://www.baen.com/readonline/index/read/sku/9781625792778; set in Buettner's ongoing Orphanage-Orphan's Legacy universe, and set chronologically after the end of his eighth novel, Balance Point.
 "The 100 MPG Carburetor and Other Self-Evident Truths" (Novelette-length, February 2015), Published on line as part of the Baen Free Library, https://www.baen.com/readonline/index/read/sku/9781625793805
 "The Trouble With Millenials" (February 2016), Published on line as part of the Baen Free Library, https://www.baen.com/readonline/index/read/sku/9781625794987
 "Homecoming" in "Star Destroyers" (March 2018), edited by Tony Daniel and Christopher Ruocchio https://www.amazon.com/Star-Destroyers-Christopher-Ruocchio/dp/1481483099/ref=sr_1_1?s=books&ie=UTF8&qid=1534692315&sr=1-1&keywords=star+destroyers&dpID=51CzJ2GayKL&preST=_SY291_BO1,204,203,200_QL40_&dpSrc=srch , set in Buettner's "Orphanage-Orphan's Legacy" universe. 
 "The Species as Big as The Ritz" (Forthcoming, March 2019) in "Voices of the Fall" , edited by John Ringo and Kelly Lockhart.
 "The Frost Queen" (Forthcoming) in "Noir Fatale", edited by Larry Correia and Kacey Ezell.

Critical opinion
The Washington Post and The Denver Post favorably compared Buettner's debut novel, Orphanage, to Robert Heinlein's 1959 classic Starship Troopers, to which the author has written that Orphanage is a deliberate literary homage to Robert Heinlein, and also to Joe Haldeman.  Tor.com Other critics have compared Buettner's books favorably to the work of "Golden Age" science fiction writers Poul Anderson, Andre Norton, H. Beam Piper, L. Sprague de Camp, to recent writers Joe Haldeman and John Scalzi, and to such diverse artists as Miguel de Cervantes, Monty Python and P. G. Wodehouse.  Buettner was nominated for the Quill Award for Best New Writer in 2005. Orphanage was nominated for the Quill Award as best science fiction/fantasy/horror novel of 2004, and has recently been described as "one of the great works of modern military science fiction." Buettner's novel Balance Point was also reviewed favorably. Publishers Weekly said his 2017 novel, "The Golden Gate" was a lavishly detailed narrative...[that] reverberates with current concerns over life extension [and its ] underlying mystery and unpredictability keep the pages turning." The science fiction review Tangent called it an "entertaining, thought-provoking read smartly-told...with just the right touches of SF, history, and science."

Commercial performance

Buettner's first novel, Orphanage, made numerous bestseller lists, including Barnes & Noble's overall paperback Top 50 and the Locus Magazine paperback Top 10. Orphanage was nominated for the Quill Award as best Science Fiction/Fantasy/Horror novel of 2004. Orphanage's publisher (which changed its name from Time Warner Aspect to Little Brown Orbit) reissued Orphanage in April, 2008.  As of June, 2008, the book was in its sixth printing.  Orphanage, as well as others of Buettner's novels, has been translated by foreign publishers into Chinese, Czech, French, Japanese, Russian and Spanish, was published in hardcover by the Science Fiction Bookclub, and as an ebook in various formats.  Orbit also markets the Jason Wander series in a separate edition geared for the United Kingdom market.  The rest of the series is believed to have performed similarly to Orphanage. Buettner's subsequent series, the Orphan's Legacy series, was a nationally bestselling series. Particularly, the third book, "Balance Point" was a Bookscan national bestseller when released in trade paperback in April 2014.

Style
All five books in the Jason Wander series are told in the first-person viewpoint and distinctive voice of the protagonist, Jason Wander.  They follow his coming of age and growth from misfit soldier to maverick general during a decades-long interstellar war.  Buettner said in an interview that "Writing generation-spanning space opera through a single, first-person-viewpoint character is like painting the Death Star with a toothbrush."

The three books in the Orphan's Legacy series are also told in the first-person viewpoint, primarily, although not exclusively, through the protagonist Jazen Parker.

The Golden Gate is told from multiple viewpoints, and incorporates detailed historical vignettes triggered by historic objects discovered by the contemporary protagonists.

References

External links
Official web site
Official Blog

Robert Buettner Interview at BookReviewsAndMore.ca

Living people
21st-century American novelists
American male novelists
American science fiction writers
Military science fiction writers
1947 births
American male short story writers
21st-century American short story writers
21st-century American male writers